Floyd E. Norman (born June 22, 1935) is an American animator, writer, and cartoonist. Over the course of his career, Norman has worked for various animation companies, among them Walt Disney Animation Studios, Hanna-Barbera Productions, Ruby-Spears, Film Roman and Pixar.

Life and career 
Norman's love for animated pictures started when he watched the Disney feature films Dumbo and Bambi. Norman attended Art Center College of Design in Pasadena, California where he majored in illustration. He had his start as an assistant to Katy Keene comic book artist Bill Woggon, who lived in the Santa Barbara, California, area Norman grew up in. In 1957, Norman was employed as an inbetweener on Sleeping Beauty (released in 1959) at The Walt Disney Company, becoming the first African-American artist to remain at the studio on a long-term basis. Following his work on Sleeping Beauty, Norman was drafted, and returned to the studio after his service in 1960 to work on One Hundred and One Dalmatians (1961) and The Sword in the Stone (1963). After Walt Disney saw some of the inter-office sketches Norman made to entertain his co-workers, he was reassigned to the story department, where he worked with Larry Clemmons on the story for The Jungle Book.

After Walt Disney's death in 1966, Floyd Norman left the Disney studio to co-found Vignette Films, Inc., with business partner animator/director Leo Sullivan. Vignette Films, Inc. produced six animated films and was one of the first companies to produce films on the subject of black history. Norman and Sullivan worked together on various projects, including segments for Sesame Street and the original Hey, Hey, Hey, It's Fat Albert television special conceived by Bill Cosby, which aired in 1969 on NBC. In 1972, a different Fat Albert and the Cosby Kids Saturday morning cartoon series was produced for CBS by Filmation Associates. 

Norman returned to Disney at one point in the early 1970s to work on the Disney animated feature Robin Hood, and worked on several animated television programs at Hanna-Barbera and Ruby-Spears. In the 1980s he worked as a writer in the comic strip department at Disney and was the last scripter for the Mickey Mouse comic strip before it was discontinued.

He has worked on motion pictures for Walt Disney Animation Studios and Pixar, having contributed creatively as a story artist on films such as Toy Story 2 and Monsters, Inc. for Pixar and Mulan, Dinosaur and The Hunchback of Notre Dame for Walt Disney Animation Studios, among others, including Reel FX's Free Birds.

Norman has also published several books of cartoons inspired by his lifetime of experiences in the animation industry, Faster! Cheaper!: The Flip Side to the Art of Animation ; Son of Faster, Cheaper!: A Sharp Look Inside the Animation Business ; How the Grinch Stole Disney ; Disk Drive: Animated Humor in the Digital Age;  and Suspended Animation: The Art Form That Refuses To Die.

Norman has also authored a semi-biographical animation primer, titled: Animated Life: A Lifetime of tips, tricks, techniques and stories from an animation Legend (Animation Masters) , that was published by Focal Press in 2013. He is the subject of the 2016 documentary Floyd Norman: An Animated Life.

He is a columnist for the websites JimHillMedia.com and AfroKids.com.

In 2016 Norman was appointed to the education and outreach committee of the Academy of Motion Picture Arts & Sciences.

Debuting at the 2017 D23 Expo, Disney Editions published the picture book A Kiss Goodnight  written by Richard M. Sherman and illustrated by Norman.

Norman was also part of a Members Only Preview for the behind-the-scenes exhibition titled Walt Disney’s The Jungle Book: Making a Masterpiece during a special talk alongside Andreas Deja, Darleen Carr and Bruce Reitherman which took place on June 22, 2022. The exhibition will take place at The Walt Disney Family Museum from June 23, 2022 to January 8, 2023.

Awards and honors 
Norman was inducted into the Black Filmmakers Hall of Fame in 1979. Norman was a recipient of the Winsor McCay Award for "recognition of lifetime or career contributions to the art of animation" at the 2002 Annie Awards. Norman was named a Disney Legend in 2007. In 2008, he appeared as Guest of Honor at Comic-Con International, where he was given an Inkpot Award.
In 2013 Norman was honored with the "Sergio Award" from The Comic Art Professional Society (CAPS). in 2014, Norman was the recipient of the DFC Disney Legend award given by the Disneyana Fan Club.
In 2015 Norman received the Friz Freleng Award for Lifetime Achievement for Excellence in Animation from the International Family Film Festival.
In 2016, Norman was the recipient of the Special Achievement Award (Legendary Animator) from the African-American Film Critics Association.
In June 2018, Norman received an honorary Doctorate of Philosophy degree from Cogswell Polytechnical College.
In May 2019, Norman was honored with the Milton Caniff Lifetime Achievement Award from the National Cartoonists Society.

Filmography

Film

Television

References

External links
 
 
 
 

1935 births
Living people
African-American artists
African-American comics creators
Animators from California
American comic strip cartoonists
Walt Disney Animation Studios people
Hanna-Barbera people
American storyboard artists
People from Santa Barbara, California
Disney comics artists
Disney comics writers
Disney Legends
Inkpot Award winners